This is a list of food industry trade associations. A trade association is an organization founded and funded by businesses that operate in a specific industry. An industry trade association participates in public relations activities such as advertising, education, political donations, lobbying and publishing, but its focus is collaboration between companies. Associations may offer other services, such as producing conferences, networking or charitable events or offering classes or educational materials. Many associations are non-profit organizations governed by bylaws and directed by officers who are also members.

Food industry trade associations

A
 American Cheese Society – promotes and supports American cheeses, including artisan and specialty cheeses
 American Frozen Food Institute – trade association and lobbying group for manufacturers and distributors of frozen food
 American Mushroom Institute
 American Pie Council
 Assured Food Standards
 Australian Food and Grocery Council

B
 Bread Bakers Guild of America
 British Apples and Pears - the national trade body in the UK for the apple industry. 
 British Sandwich Association – aims to improve the sandwich industry by setting standards and rewarding excellent sandwich manufacturers and retailers at the annual Sammies awards

C
 California Avocado Society
 Canada Beef
 Canadian Beef Check-Off Agency
 California Beer and Beverage Distributors
 Canadian Cattlemen's Association
 Canadian Meat Council
 Canadian Pork Council
 Canadian Restaurant and Foodservices Association
 Consumer Brands Association
 Cornish Pasty Association
 Canadian Veal Association

E
 Efficient Consumer Response
 Europatat

F
 Federation of Oils, Seeds and Fats Associations
 FEFANA
 Florida Citrus Mutual
 Food and Drink Federation (UK)
 Food Federation Germany
 Food Products Association
 FoodDrinkEurope
 Freshfel Europe

G
 Grain and Feed Trade Association
 Grocery Manufacturers Association
 Guild of Bangladeshi Restaurateurs

I
 Idaho Potato Commission
Independent Restaurant Coalition
 International Association of Engineering and Food
 International Association of Operative Millers
 International Bottled Water Association
 International Dairy-Deli-Bakery Association
 International Food Information Council

J
 Juice Products Association

L
 Local Authority Caterers Association
 Love Irish Food

M
 Meat Industry Association of New Zealand
 Melton Mowbray Pork Pie Association
 Montana Stockgrower's Association
 Mutton Renaissance Campaign

N
 National Cattlemen's Beef Association
 National Chicken Council
 National Confectioners Association
 National Frozen & Refrigerated Foods Association
 National Hot Dog and Sausage Council 
 National Registry of Food Safety Professionals
 National Restaurant Association
 National Turkey Federation
 National Yogurt Association
 Natural Products Association
 North American Meat Institute
 North American Meat Processors Association
 North American Olive Oil Association

P
 Plant Based Foods Association
 Potato Council
 Processed Vegetable Growers' Association
 Produce Marketing Association

S
 Scotland Food & Drink
 Scotty Brand Ltd
 Southern Hemisphere Association of Fresh Fruit Exporters
 Specialty Coffee Association of Indonesia
 Specialty Food Association
 Specialty Wine Retailers Association

T
 TURYID

U
 U.S. Poultry & Egg Association
 United States Brewers' Association
  Uzbekistan Food Industry Association

W
 The Washington Restaurant Association
 The Water Dispenser & Hydration Association
 Wisconsin Restaurant Association
 World Apple and Pear Association
 Worldwide Food Expo

See also

 Employers' organization

References

 
Lists of trade associations
Trade associations